Sara Harvey may refer to:

 Sara M. Harvey (born 1976), American costume designer and author
 Sara Harvey (Pretty Little Liars), a character TV series Pretty Little Liars